Cho Hyang-gi (born 23 March 1992) is a South Korean footballer who plays as a centre-back for Gimpo FC.

Career

Kwangwoon University
Cho Hyang-gi began his career at the Gwacheon Elementary School. He kept his role as a striker until graduating Jaehyun High School. He changed his role to a centre-back after entering the Kwangwoon University's association football team.

Seoul E-Land FC
He joined Seoul E-Land FC in 2015. He changed his role to a striker by then. He began to self-train as a centre-back again, preparing for the 2017 K League Challenge season. He returned to the club for the 2021 season but left the club during the mid of the season by mutual consent.

Gimpo FC
Hyang-gi joined Gimpo FC of K3 League after leaving Seoul E-Land FC.

He has returned to K League 2 as the club joined the league for the 2022 season.

References

External links 

 

1992 births
Living people
Kwangwoon University alumni
Association football defenders
South Korean footballers
Seoul E-Land FC players
Changwon City FC players
Pocheon Citizen FC players
K League 2 players
Korea National League players
K3 League players
K4 League players